Walken may refer to:

Christopher Walken, American actor
Georgianne Walken, (born 1939), American casting director 
"Walken", a Wilco song from their album Sky Blue Sky
"Walken's Syndrome", a Fugazi song from their album In on the Kill Taker

See also
Chaim Walkin (1945-2022), Orthodox rabbi, dean, and lecturer
Walkin'